Shahpur Bamheta is a former Estate of Yaduvanshi Ahirs in erstwhile Ghaziabad district, Uttar Pradesh, India. Adjacent to Delhi-Meerut Expressway & N.H. 91(G.T Road). It is located 6.8 km away from Ghaziabad Railway Station towards N.H. 91. The village is famous for its wrestling culture and dominancy in nearby area. It is dominated by the people of Yadav community. During its rule under Yaduvanshi Ahirs Bamheta Estate had 52,000 Bighas of Land.   

There is a post office of India Post located in the village and Shahpur Bamheta, pin code is 201002. The post office name is Shahpur Bamheta Branch Post Office and post office type is branch office.

Current Assembly MLA of Shahpur Bamheta is Ajit Pal Tyagi and Vijay Kumar Singh is current Parliament MP from Ghaziabad parliamentary constituency.

Geography
Shahpur Bamheta is located at 28.6462° N, 77.4745° E. It has an average elevation of 213 meters.

Transportation
Shahpur Bamheta is well connected with N.H. 24 & N.H. 91. Anyone can reach here easily by auto rickshaw, bus etc. Nearest Railway station is Ghaziabad railway station which is 6.8 km away.

External links
 Shahpur Bamheta (Zamindari)

References

Villages in Ghaziabad district, India